Shaun Prendergast (born 1958) is an English actor and writer.

Career
He was born in North Shields and holds a BA Hons from Bretton Hall College. He was an actor and playwright in residence for Northumberland Theatre Company before joining the BBC Radio Drama Company, and subsequently became a founder member of Kenneth Branagh's newly formed Renaissance Theatre Company. Awards include a Sony Award, a Writers' Guild Award and a Time Out Award. in 2020 he published his first novel, Benny Blue Eyes.

Selected TV credits

Prendergast has appeared in The Bill, EastEnders, Holby City, Hotel Babylon, The Lightning Kid, Heartbeat, New Tricks, Emmerdale and Collision by Anthony Horowitz. In summer 2010, he filmed an episode of Tracy Beaker Returns, which aired on CBBC Channel. As well as appearances in Casualty, Doctors, WPC 56, and Father Brown he plays the role of Robert Bain, the Head of Education for East Kilbride, in the drama series Waterloo Road. In 2020, he appeared in an episode of the BBC soap opera Doctors as Archie Matthews. He appeared again in 2021 as Doug Abbott.

Selected film credits

 The Stepdad
 Henry V
 Mary Shelley's Frankenstein
 In the Bleak Midwinter
 Frozen

Stage credits

Christmas of 2010 saw Shaun play the role of Sarah the Cook in the pantomime Dick Whittington at the Lyric Theatre, Hammersmith, directed by Steve Marmion. The production was given excellent reviews, with the Daily Telegraph declaring that Shaun, in his pantomime debut, had created the 'finest, funniest pantomime Dame in London'. In early 2010, the role of Mr Boo in The Rise and Fall of Little Voice by Jim Cartright at the Vaudeville Theatre, London. Directed by Terry Johnson. Glamour by Stephen Lowe at Nottingham Playhouse directed by Bill Alexander.
And Shaun in Searching for Tom Hadaway for Live Theatre, which Shaun also wrote and directed.
Hamlet,
Much Ado about Nothing,
Twelfth Night,
As You Like It (for Kenneth Branagh's Renaissance Company national tour and Phoenix Theatre, West End)),
The Glee Club (Bush and the Duchess Theatre, West End),
Macbeth and the Sam Shephard season at the BAC and
 A Going Concern at Hampstead Theatre Club.
  Waitress at the Adelphi Theatre London

Other theatre includes Grace, Twelfth Night, Candida, (NTC), Dracula, Spot the Lady, A View from the Bridge, Strippers, (Newcastle Playhouse), Twelve Tales of Tyneside (Live Theatre), Sisterly Feelings (Manchester Library Theatre), As You Like it (Nottingham Playhouse), The Miser (Salisbury).

Radio credits

Westway, The Goldfish Bowl, Phoenix England, The Bee-keeper’s Apprentice, The Little World of Don Camillo, My Uncle Freddie and over two hundred individual plays.

Writing credits

Television and radio writing includes
2006–2007 Multi-episodes of The Roman Mysteries, Rocket Man (BBC) as well as The Lightning Kid (BBC)
Other: Multi- episodes of  – My Parents Are Aliens (GRANADA), EastEnders (BBC), Grafters (CENTRAL), Equinox (BBC), Microsoap (BBC), Soldier, Soldier (CENTRAL).

Film includes
Rebel Zone (BBC Films)
The Stepdad,
Henry V,
Mary Shelley's Frankenstein,
In the Bleak Midwinter,
Frozen,
Bye Bye Columbus.
Harrigan,
Stupid Cults,
Rudolph & His New Friend Frosty Mikey The Canary

Theatre writing includes
Potter’s Wheel, The Firefawn Trilogy, A Fine and Private Place, Distinguished Service, Little Victories, The Green Eyed Monster of Ecrovid, The Witches' Kitchen, Twelve Tales of Tyneside, Poles Apart, Come and Make Eyes at me, Karl Marx Live in Concert, The True History of the Tragic Life and triumphant Death of Julia Pastrana, the Ugliest Woman in the World, The False Corpse and The Biggest Adventure in the World.
In 2013 'The True History of the Tragic Life and Triumphant Death of Julia Pastrana, the Ugliest Woman in the World' was presented at the Brick Theatre in Brooklyn and the Tympanic Theatre in Chicago. Earlier that year, Julia Pastrana's body had been returned from Oslo to her birthplace in Mexico. An article in The New York Times credited Prendergast's play as being the inspiration for the campaign to have Julia Pastrana repatriated to her birthplace.

Adaptations include
Cinderella, Beauty and the Beast, The Giant Prince, The Three Musketeers, The Canterville Ghost and The Day of the Triffids.

Television includes
The Lightning Kid, Rocket Man, Soldier, Soldier, EastEnders, Grafters, Equinox, Sunshine and Zak in "Tugs", My Parents are Aliens and Microsoap. He also played a small role in Tracy Beaker Returns as the Council Manager.

Radio includes
Open Mike, Kiss Me Quick, Only the Good Die Young, Phoenix England, A Fake’s Progress, Travellin' Light, the Bee-Keeper's Apprentice, "Spread a Little Happiness" and The Goldfish Bowl.

References

External links

Living people
People from North Shields
Male actors from Tyne and Wear
Writers from Tyne and Wear
1958 births
Pantomime dames
English writers
English male television actors
English male film actors
English male radio actors
English male stage actors
English male voice actors